The International Conference on Theory and Applications of Models of Computation (TAMC) is an academic conference in the field of theoretical computer science. TAMC has been organized annually since 2004. Previous editors of the TAMC conference proceedings include Manindra Agrawal and Petr Kolman. The conference proceedings are published in the Lecture Notes in Computer Science (LNCS) series by Springer.

References

External links 
 Theory and Applications of Models of Computation at DBLP
 Web page of TAMC 2015 in Singapore
 Web page of TAMC 2014 in Chennai
 Web page of TAMC 2013 in Hong Kong
 Web page of TAMC 2012 in Beijing
 TAMC 2011 in Tokyo at DBLP
 Web page of TAMC 2010 in Prague
 TAMC 2009 in Changsha at DBLP
 TAMC 2008 in Xi'an at DBLP
 TAMC 2007 in Shanghai at DBLP
 TAMC 2006 in Beijing at DBLP

Theoretical computer science conferences